Southcoates railway station was a railway station on the North Eastern Railway's Victoria Dock Branch Line in Hull, East Riding of Yorkshire, England. It was opened by the York and North Midland Railway on 8 May 1848. The station was closed in November 1854 and reopened on 1 June 1864 before final closure on 19 October 1964. It served the suburb of Southcoates.

Since closure the station has been completely demolished.

References

 

Disused railway stations in Kingston upon Hull
Railway stations in Great Britain opened in 1848
Railway stations in Great Britain closed in 1964
Former York and North Midland Railway stations
Beeching closures in England
Hull and Holderness Railway